The consensus 1951 College Basketball All-American team, as determined by aggregating the results of five major All-American teams.  To earn "consensus" status, a player must win honors from a majority of the following teams: the Associated Press, Look Magazine, The United Press International, Collier's Magazine and the International News Service.

1951 Consensus All-America team

Individual All-America teams

AP Honorable Mention:

 Ernie Beck, Pennsylvania
 Ron Bontemps, Beloit
 Frank Guisness, Washington
 Roger Johnson, Arizona
 Jack Kiley, Syracuse
 Johnny O'Brien, Seattle
 Ray Ragelis, Northwestern
 Eddie Sheldrake, UCLA
 Jim Slaughter, South Carolina
 Don Sunderlage, Illinois
 Bobby Watson, Kentucky

See also
 1950–51 NCAA men's basketball season

References

NCAA Men's Basketball All-Americans
All-Americans